Ni Daolang  (April 12, 1879 − May 10, 1952) was a politician and military leader in the Republic of China. He was an important politician of the Reformed Government of the Republic of China and the Reorganized National Government of China (Republic of China-Nanjing). His courtesy name was Bingwen. He was born in Fuyang, Anhui, and was a nephew of Anhui clique General Ni Sichong.

Biography 
In 1913, Ni Sichong was appointed Military Governor of Anhui, Ni Daolang was also appointed Governor of the Marketing for Changlu Salt General Bureau. In 1918, Ni Daolang was appointed Manager of the Fengyang Barrier. On June 2, 1921, he suppressed a demonstration of students by using military force (the Tragic Incident of June 2, Anhui), so he was criticized by public opinion, and having lost his post, he escaped to Tianjin.

In November 1924, Duan Qirui was appointed Provisional Chief Executive, Ni Daolang was also appointed Special Negotiator for Military Countermeasure to Anhui. In early 1927, Zhang Zongchang was appointed Vice-Supreme Commander of the Anguojun and was the Supreme Commander of the Zhili-Shandong (Zhi-Lu) United Army. Zhang invited Ni, and appointed him Commander of the Reserve of the Zhi-Lu United Army. But after the defeat of Zhi-Lu United Army by the National Revolutionary Army, Ni escaped to Tianjing again.

In 1937, the Second Sino-Japanese War broke out, Ni Daolang contacted with Liang Hongzhi, Yin Rugeng, Jiang Chaozong and Wang Yitang secretly harboured the intention of creating a pro-Japanese government. Next July, Ni became the president of the Local Preservation Council of Anhui Province. On November, he participated in the Reformed Government of the Republic of China, and was appointed Governor of Anhui Province.

In March 1940, Ni Daolang participated in the Wang Jingwei regime, and when in September the committee system was introduced to Anhui Provincial Government, Ni remained as its head. In January 1943, Anhui Provincial Government abolished the committee system, on that time, Ni also resigned from his post. From 1942, he worked as Member of the Nanjing National Government.

After the Reorganised National Government of China had collapsed, Ni Daolang was arrested by Chiang Kaishek's National Government. After the proclamation of the People's Republic of China, he was sent to Bengbu in March 1952. He was convicted of treason and surrender to the enemy (namely Hanjian) and sentenced to death on the Court-martial of the Committee for Control of the Military, Bengbu City. On May 10, he was executed.

References 
 
 

1879 births
1952 deaths
Politicians from Fuyang
Republic of China politicians from Anhui
Military personnel of the Republic of China
Executed Chinese collaborators with Imperial Japan
20th-century executions by China
Executed Republic of China people
Governors of Anhui
Executed people from Anhui